Óscar Aranda Subiela (born 4 April 2002) is a Spanish professional footballer who plays as a winger for Real Madrid Castilla. He is a youth international for Spain.

Career statistics

Club 
.

Honours 

 Real Madrid Juvenil A

 UEFA Youth League: 2019–20

References

External links 

 Real Madrid profile
 
 
 

2002 births
Living people
Footballers from Granada
Spanish footballers
Association football wingers
Real Madrid Castilla footballers
Primera Federación players
Spain youth international footballers
Segunda División B players